Susan Griffin (born January 26, 1943) is a radical feminist philosopher, essayist and playwright particularly known for her innovative, hybrid-form ecofeminist works.

Life
Griffin was born in Los Angeles, California, in 1943 and has resided in California since then. Following her father's death when she was 16, she bounced around the family but was eventually taken into the home and family of noted artist Morton Dimondstein. Her biological family were of Irish, Scottish, Welsh and German ancestry. Having spent a year in a post-War Jewish home, her German heritage wasn't openly spoken of and she initially demonized Germans, but later made several trips to Germany (including to the Mittelbau-Dora concentration camp) to reconcile her Jewish and German heritages. She attended the University of California, Berkeley for two years, then transferred to San Francisco State College, where she received her Bachelor of Arts degree in Creative Writing (1965) and her Master of Arts degree (1973), both degrees under the tutelage of Kay Boyle.  She has taught as an adjunct professor at UC Berkeley as well as at Stanford University and California Institute of Integral Studies. Griffin has taught at the California Institute for Integral Studies, Pacifica Graduate Institute, the Wright Institute, and the University of California.

She currently lives in Berkeley, California. Griffin's papers are located at the Schlesinger Library, Radcliffe Institute, at Harvard University.

Work
Griffin has written 21 books, including works of nonfiction, poetry, anthologies, plays, and a screenplay. Her work has been translated into over 12 languages. Griffin describes her work as "draw[ing] connections between the destruction of nature, the diminishment of women and racism, and trac[ing] the causes of war to denial in both private and public life."

"Rape: The All-American Crime" (1971), an article published in Ramparts, was one of the first publications about rape from a feminist perspective.

Woman and Nature: The Roaring Inside Her (1978) has sold more than 100,000 copies, and draws connections between ecological destruction, sexism, and racism. Considered a form of prose-poetry, this work is believed to have launched ecofeminism in the United States. Griffin attributes her connection to ecofeminism to her upbringing along the Pacific Coast, which she believes cultivated her awareness of ecology.

Griffin articulated her anti-pornography feminism in Pornography and Silence: Culture's Revenge Against Nature (1981). In this work she makes the case that although the pursuit of freedom of speech, could lead to a position against the censorship of pornography, in the case of pornography the freedom to create pornography leads to a compromise of "human liberation" when this term includes liberation for all of humankind including the emancipation of women. She argues against the elision of pornography and eros, arguing that they are separate and opposing ideas. According to Griffin, pornography's origins are rooted in a widespread fear of nature, and in a pornographic culture, men are told to take on the role of the "Killer", while women become the "victims". This, according to Griffin, teaches women to self-deprecate, and fuels an unhealthy, perverted culture.
In contrast, Griffin argues that "real sexual liberation requires a reconciliation with nature, a healing between body and spirit". Critics largely responded to Pornography and Culture with contempt, many complaining that it came off as more of a rant than realistic philosophical discussion.

Awards
Griffin has received a MacArthur grant for Peace and International Cooperation, NEA and Guggenheim Foundation fellowships, and an Emmy Award for the play Voices. She is featured in the 2014 feminist history film She's Beautiful When She's Angry. She was a finalist for the Pulitzer Prize for General Nonfiction in 1993 for A Chorus of Stones: The Private Life of War.

Criticism 
Many critics praise Griffin's blunt takes and insights to the role of feminism in every major issue today, while others have criticized her writings for being too convoluted or ranting. Largely, reviews for Griffin's work take opposing views on the intertwining and complicated connections she suggests between the woman and larger worldly issues such as war, disease, pornography, and nature itself. These webs are mirrored in her unique writing style which critics have reflected upon extensively.

In a 1994 review by Carol H. Cantrell, Griffins' Woman and Nature is dubbed "hard to describe. Most of it looks like prose on the page but the thought is fragmented, metaphorical, and discontinuous; there are plenty of stories, but they too are often elliptical and metaphorical." In a review of What Her Body Thought: A Journey into the Shadows, Susan Dion of The Women's Review of Books wrote, "...Griffin is not merely reiterating old themes in feminist scholarship or the history of medicine; rather, she probes, ponders, and suggests different ways of considering many interrelated issues...Griffin's musings and hypotheses are fresh, smart, and instructive, if not always convincing."

Published works
Woman and Nature: the Roaring Inside Her (1978) Ecofeminist treatise (1st Edition, has since been reprinted) 
Rape: The Power of Consciousness (1979) OCLC 781089176 
Pornography and Silence: Culture's Revenge Against Nature (1981) OCLC 964062418 
"Sadomasochism and the erosion of self: a critical reading of Story of O," in Against Sadomasochism: A Radical Feminist Analysis, ed. Robin Ruth Linden (East Palo Alto, Calif. : Frog in the Well, 1982.), pp. 183–201
Unremembered Country: poems (Copper Canyon Press, 1987) OCLC 16905255 
A Chorus of Stones: the Private Life of War (1993) Psychological aspects of violence, war, womanhood OCLC 1005479046 
The Eros of Everyday Life: Essays on Ecology, Gender and Society (1995) OCLC 924501690 
Bending Home: Selected New Poems, 1967-1998 (Copper Canyon Press, 1998) OCLC 245705378 
What Her Body Thought: a Journey into the Shadows (1999) 
The Book of the Courtesans: a Catalogue of Their Virtues (2001)
Wrestling with the Angel of Democracy: On Being an American Citizen (2008)
Transforming Terror: Remembering the Soul of the World, co-edited with Karen Lofthus Carrington (University of California Press, 2011)

References

External links

 
Poetry Foundation Biography
 Susan Griffin's reading lectures, RealAudio
Papers of Susan Griffin, 1914-2015 (inclusive), 1943-2015 (bulk): A Finding Aid. Schlesinger Library, Radcliffe Institute, Harvard University.

1943 births
American people of German descent
American people of Irish descent
American people of Scottish descent
American people of Welsh descent
American feminist writers
Jewish anti-racism activists
Jewish feminists
Anti-pornography feminists
Ecofeminists
Emmy Award winners
Jewish American writers
Jewish poets
American lesbian writers
Living people
Writers from Los Angeles
Lesbian feminists
American women poets
LGBT Jews
American LGBT dramatists and playwrights
American women essayists
Radical feminists
American LGBT poets
American women dramatists and playwrights
Writers from Berkeley, California
20th-century American poets
20th-century American women writers
21st-century American Jews
21st-century American women writers